Basil Leonard Rogers (20 June 1896 – 9 October 1975) was an English cricketer. Rogers was a right-handed batsman. Born in Bedford, Bedfordshire, he was the son of Richard Rogers and Julia Marsh. His father was head groundsman at Bedford Modern School, there is also an indication that he played for Bedfordshire or Oxfordshire, before either had a county cricket club.  His family was large and he had 8 other siblings. He was educated in his hometown at Bedford Modern School, where he played for the school cricket team.

Rogers made his debut for Bedfordshire in the 1911 Minor Counties Championship against Hertfordshire. He continued to play Minor counties cricket for Bedfordshire after the First World War, appearing for the county until 1924.

1923 saw Rogers make his debut in first-class cricket for Glamorgan against Northamptonshire in the County Championship. On debut, Rogers scored 4 runs in the Glamorgan first-innings, before being dismissed by Albert Thomas, while in the second-innings he scored an unbeaten 16. He bowled 5 overs in the match, without taking a wicket. He played a further first-class match in 1923, against Lancashire. In this match, he scored 12 runs in Glamorgan's first-innings, before being dismissed by Lawrence Cook, while in the second-innings he was run out for 14. With the ball, Rogers claimed his only first-class wicket, that of Lancashire captain Jack Sharp.

Rogers only played 2 first-class matches for Glamorgan, and upon leaving Bedfordshire at the end of the 1924 season, he joined Oxfordshire, for whom he played Minor counties cricket for sporadically between 1925 and 1935. At some point during his life, he married a woman called Nellie Wilson. Rogers died at Pateley Bridge, Yorkshire on 9 October 1975. His death was not afforded an entry in the 1976 Wisden Cricketers' Almanack.

References and notes

External links
Basil Rogers at ESPNcricinfo
Basil Rogers at CricketArchive

1896 births
1975 deaths
Sportspeople from Bedford
People educated at Bedford Modern School
English cricketers
Bedfordshire cricketers
Glamorgan cricketers
Oxfordshire cricketers